There are many places named Ferry Point in the world:
 Ferry Point, Hampshire on the Hayling Island of England
 Ferry Point, Hong Kong in Kowloon, Hong Kong
 Ferry Point, California, United States
 Ferry Point Border Crossing on the U.S.–Canada border
 Ferry Point Park in the Bronx, New York City